{{DISPLAYTITLE:C20H16O5}}
The molecular formula C20H16O5 (molar mass: 336.33 g/mol, exact mass: 336.0998 u) may refer to:

 Alpinumisoflavone
 Psoralidin

Molecular formulas